Wilberne Augusmat is a Haitian footballer who plays as a midfielder for Violette in the Ligue Haïtienne.

References

External links
 
 

Living people
1994 births
Haitian footballers
Haiti international footballers
Association football midfielders
People from Saint-Marc